Kwacha is a constituency of the National Assembly of Zambia. It covers the eastern part of Kitwe and a rural area to the east of the city in Kitwe District of Copperbelt Province.

List of MPs

References

Constituencies of the National Assembly of Zambia
Constituencies established in 1973
1973 establishments in Zambia